Xerochlora martinaria is a species of emerald moth in the family Geometridae. It is found in North America.

The MONA or Hodges number for Xerochlora martinaria is 7080.

References

Further reading

 

Hemitheini
Articles created by Qbugbot
Moths described in 1948